Sidney Clifton Horace Evans (1881 – 8 January 1927) was a British heavyweight boxer who competed in the early twentieth century. He won a silver medal in Boxing at the 1908 Summer Olympics. Evans was born in Aldermaston in West Berkshire.

References

1881 births
1927 deaths
English male boxers
Heavyweight boxers
Olympic boxers of Great Britain
Olympic silver medallists for Great Britain
Olympic medalists in boxing
Medalists at the 1908 Summer Olympics
Boxers at the 1908 Summer Olympics
People from Aldermaston